Jalan Airport or Labuan Airport Road, Federal Route 739, is a major federal road in Federal Territory of Labuan, Malaysia.

Features

At most sections, the Federal Route 739 was built under the JKR R5 road standard, allowing a maximum speed of 90 km/h.

List of junctions and town

References

Malaysian Federal Roads
Roads in Labuan